Devon M. Torrence (born May 8, 1989) is a professional baseball outfielder for the Charleston Dirty Birds of the Atlantic League of Professional Baseball. He also played American and Canadian football as a cornerback in the National Football League (NFL) and Canadian Football League (CFL). Torrence signed with Minnesota Vikings as an undrafted free agent in 2011. He was also a member of the Cincinnati Bengals, New York Jets and the Montreal Alouettes. He played college football at Ohio State.

Early years
Torrence attended Canton South High School in Canton, Ohio.  Torrence was selected to the first-team all-conference in his last three years of high school. Torrence also played wide receiver, safety and running back during high school.

College career
Torrence played football at Ohio State. In all 4 years in Ohio State, he finished with 99 tackles, 4 interceptions, 5 forced fumbles, one sack.

In his freshman year, on September 8, 2007, he played at Wide receiver in which he had one reception for no yards against Akron as Ohio State wins 20-2.

In his sophomore year, on October 18, 2008, he recorded one tackle and a forced fumble against Michigan State as Ohio State wins 45-7.

In his junior year, on September 5, 2009, he recorded 2 tackles in the season opener against Navy as Ohio State wins 31-27. On September 12, 2009, he recorded 8 tackles and one sack against No. 3 USC but Ohio State loss 18-15. On September 19, 2009, he recorded one tackle against Toledo in a shutout victory 38-0. On September 26, 2009, he recorded 3 tackles against Illinois as Ohio State won the game 30-0. On October 3, 2009, he recorded a tackle and a forced fumble against Indiana as Ohio State wins 33-14.

In his senior year, on September 11, 2010, he recorded 8 tackles and a pass deflection against Miami (FL) and Ohio State won 36-24. On September 18, 2010, he recorded 1 tackle and 2 pass deflections against Ohio as Ohio State wins 43-7. On September 25, 2010, he just recorded 2 tackles against Eastern Michigan as Ohio State wins 73-20. On October 2, 2010, he recorded 3 tackles against Illinois and Ohio State wins 24-13. On October 9, 2010, he recorded one tackle, an interception and 2 passes defended against Indiana as Ohio State wins 38-10. On October 16, 2010, he recorded 6 tackles and passes defended against No. 18 ranked Wisconsin but Ohio State loss 31-18.

Baseball career

Houston Astros
Torrence was drafted by the Houston Astros in the 16th round of the 2007 MLB June Amateur Draft. Torrence played two seasons as an Outfielder for the Greeneville Astros a minor league baseball team of the Appalachian League and Rookie-level affiliate of the Houston Astros. In two seasons with the Greenville Astros, he played in 64 games in which he had 5 runs batted in, a batting average of .150, 7 stolen bases and a slugging percentage of .170.

Kansas City Royals
On February 16, 2014, he signed with the Kansas City Royals to a minor league contract. On June 15, 2014, Torrence was assigned to the Royals's Double A Affiliate the Idaho Falls Chukars. On June 28, Torrence was released.

Florence Freedom
In July 2014, Torrence signed with the Florence Freedom of the independent Frontier League, but only appeared in two games for the team.

Lancaster Barnstormers
On April 9, 2019, Torrence signed with the Lancaster Barnstormers of the Atlantic League of Professional Baseball. He became a free agent following the season. He re-signed with the team on March 6, 2020, but the season was later canceled due to the COVID-19 pandemic. On February 20, 2021, Torrence re-signed with the Barnstormers for the 2021 season. On March 29, 2022, Torrence re-signed for the 2022 season. In 48 games for Lancaster, Torrence slumped to a .198/.375/.245 line with no home runs and 7 RBI. He was released by the team on August 4.

Charleston Dirty Birds
On August 5, 2022, Torrence signed with the Charleston Dirty Birds of the Atlantic League of Professional Baseball.

Professional career

Minnesota Vikings
On July 28, 2011, Torrence signed with Minnesota Vikings as an undrafted free agent. He played all four preseason games and recorded two tackles on defense and two on Special teams. On September 2, 2011, Torrence was waived before the 2011 season.

Cinncianti Bengals
On December 19, 2011, Torrence signed with the Cincinnati Bengals to the practice squad. On January 2, 2012, he was waived.

New York Jets
On August 1, 2012 Torrence signed with New York Jets. On August 14, 2012, he was released.

Montreal Alouettes
On June 14, 2013, he signed with the Montreal Alouettes of the Canadian Football League. On June 21, 2013, he was released by the team just before the 2013 CFL season began.

The Spring League
Torrence  participated in The Spring League in 2017.

References

External links
Ohio State Buckeyes bio
Cincinnati Bengals bio
New York Jets bio
MLB.com bio

1989 births
Living people
Players of American football from Canton, Ohio
Baseball players from Canton, Ohio
American football cornerbacks
Canadian football defensive backs
American players of Canadian football
Ohio State Buckeyes football players
Minnesota Vikings players
Cincinnati Bengals players
New York Jets players
Montreal Alouettes players
Greeneville Astros players
Sportspeople from Canton, Ohio
The Spring League players
Baseball outfielders
Lancaster Barnstormers players